PK-44 Haripur-II is a constituency for the Khyber Pakhtunkhwa Assembly of the Khyber Pakhtunkhwa province of Pakistan.

See also
 PK-43 Haripur-I
 PK-45 Haripur-III

References

External links 
 Election Commission of Pakistan's official website

Khyber Pakhtunkhwa Assembly constituencies